"Just Let Me Know" is a song recorded in late 1963 by The Temptations for the Gordy (Motown) label, written, and produced by Motown president Berry Gordy, and is the B-side to the 1964 hit single "The Way You Do the Things You Do". Both songs competed with each other and with the H-D-H production, "A Tear From A Woman's Eyes", for the A-side; the latter song was shelved for several years after losing the spot. It was recorded just days before the firing of the original member Elbridge "Al" Bryant.

In the song, the narrator tells his former love how much he misses her and that if she wants him back to tell him and he will come to her "as fast as he can". Two versions of the song were released, both of which were led by group's baritone singer and front man Paul Williams. The first pressing used a more soulful take with only Williams as lead; this version also appears on mono copies of their first album, Meet the Temptations, as well as the box set The Complete Motown Singles Vol. 4: 1964. The second pressing has a much smoother take, and has Bryant with a few lead parts on the choruses, singing the line "straight to you" the first two times on the song, while the group sings it the remaining times. This version was also released on the stereo LP and compact disc editions of Meet the Temptations. Around the time the song was recorded, Bryant had become restless, unco-operative and sometimes volatile. He would miss concerts and recording sessions, preferred his day job as a milkman to performing, and had been arguing and fighting with his fellow group members. By the time this single came out, Bryant had been fired and replaced by David Ruffin.

Despite being a B-side, "Just Let Me Know" was given just as big a promotion as its A-side, the Eddie Kendricks-led "The Way You Do the Things You Do", which was a Top 20 pop hit. Although the song did not chart nationally, it was a strong regional hit in many areas of the US. Due to the success of the A-side, Williams was prevented from having any more leads on the group's remaining A-sides, with the exception of group/multi-leads during the late 1960s.

Personnel
 Lead vocals by Paul Williams and Al Bryant (second version only)
 Background vocals by Eddie Kendricks, Melvin Franklin, Al Bryant and Otis Williams
 Instrumentation by The Funk Brothers

Notes

1963 songs
1964 singles
The Temptations songs
Songs written by Berry Gordy
Song recordings produced by Berry Gordy
Song recordings produced by Smokey Robinson
Gordy Records singles